Leah Moore (born 4 February 1978) is a British comic book writer and columnist. The daughter of comics writer Alan Moore, she frequently collaborates with her husband, writer John Reppion, as Moore & Reppion.

Biography 
Moore was born to comics writer Alan Moore and Phyllis Moore on 4 February 1978 in Northampton. Her father is well known in the comics industry, and Leah Moore grew up familiar with it.

Career
Moore began writing for comics with stories for America's Best Comics in 2002. 

Together, Moore & Reppion have scripted comics and graphic novels for the likes of 2000 AD, Channel 4 Education, Dark Horse, DC Comics, Dynamite Entertainment, Electricomics, IDW, and Self Made Hero. Moore & Reppion were consulting writers for some of the mysteries featured in Frogwares Games multi platform adventure Sherlock Holmes - Crimes & Punishments, 2014. Moore was the Project Manager and a contributing editor for the digital comics publishing and reading platform Electricomics from 2013 to 2016.

Moore has written for Dynamite Entertainment (Gail Simone's Swords of Sorrow, Red Sonja), Heavy Metal, 2000 AD (Summer Special 2018), and Shelly Bond's Black Crown Publishing (Femme Magnifique, Black Crown Quarterly). 

She has also written columns and articles for Lifetime TV online, The Big Issue, and Comic Heroes magazine.

Personal life 
Moore lives in Liverpool with Reppion and their children.

Bibliography

Comics
Wild Girl (with co-author John Reppion, and art by Shawn McManus and J.H. Williams III, Wildstorm, 2006)
Albion (plotted by Alan Moore, with co-author John Reppion, and art by Shane Oakley, Wildstorm, 2006, tpb, Wildstorm, 176 pages, December 2006, Titan Books, 144 pages, January 2007)
Accent Anthologies (with co-author John Reppion):
Witchblade: "Shades of Gray" (with co-author John Reppion, and art by Stephen Segovia, Top Cow/Dynamite Entertainment, 2007)
Raise the Dead (with co-author John Reppion, and pencil by Hugo Petrus and inks by Marc Rueda, 4-issue mini-series, Dynamite Entertainment, 2007, tpb, 120 pages, February 2008)
Savage Tales: "Battle for Atlantis" (with co-author John Reppion, and art by Pablo Marcos, in Savage Tales #1–3, Dynamite Entertainment, 2007)
Gene Simmons House of Horrors: "Into The Woods"  (with co-author John Reppion, and art by Jeff Zornow, IDW Publishing, 2007, tpb, 192 pages, April 2008)
Space Doubles: "Project: Obeah" (with co-author John Reppion, and art by Jeremy Dale and Jason Roth, Th3rd World Studios, 2007)
Nevermore: "The Black Cat" (with co-author John Reppion, and art by James Fletcher, Eye Classics, Self Made Hero, October 2007)
 "Deadeye" (with co-author John Reppion and art by Matt Timson, in Popgun No. 1, Popgun No. 2, Image Comics, 2007/2008)
Darkness vs. Eva (with co-author John Reppion and art by Edgar Salazar)
Doctor Who: "The Whispering Gallery" (with co-author John Reppion and art by Ben Templesmith, one-shot, IDW Publishing)
The Complete Dracula (with co-author John Reppion and art by Colton Worley, 5-issue limited series, Dynamite Entertainment 2009)
The Trial of Sherlock Holmes (with co-author John Reppion, Dynamite Entertainment 2009)
 The Thrill Electric with co-author John Reppion and art by WindFlower Studio, October 2011, 
Sherlock Holmes – The Liverpool Demon (with co-author John Reppion), Dynamite Entertainment, 2013

Books
 Tom Strong, 2010
 Swords of Sorrow, 2015
 Black Crown, 2017

References

External links 
 
 July 2006 interview about Albion and future projects, by Forbidden Planet
 Dynamite Entertainment announcement of their signing up

1978 births
English comics writers
Living people
People from Northampton
Female comics writers
Alan Moore
20th-century women writers